Events in the year 1700 in Japan.

Incumbents
Monarch: Higashiyama

Events
January 26 – The  8.7–9.2 Cascadia earthquake takes place off the west coast of North America, as evidenced by Japanese tsunami records.

References

 
1700s in Japan
Japan
Years of the 17th century in Japan